This is a list of the divers who will be participating at the 2020 Summer Olympics in Tokyo, Japan from 25 July to 7 August 2021. 147 divers are set to compete in the Games across 8 events.

Male divers

Female divers

References

 
Divers, 2020
Lists of acrobatic divers